Mexico competed at the Winter Olympic Games for the first time in 1928 in St. Moritz, Switzerland.  It would be another 56 years before another Mexican team would attend the Winter Games.

Bobsleigh

References

Nations at the 1928 Winter Olympics
1928
Olympics, Winter